The 2021 Erste Bank Open was a men's tennis tournament played on indoor hard courts. It was the 47th edition of the event, and part of the ATP Tour 500 Series of the 2021 ATP Tour. It was held at the Wiener Stadthalle in Vienna, Austria, from 25 until 31 October 2021. Second-seeded Alexander Zverev won the singles title.

Finals

Singles 

  Alexander Zverev def.  Frances Tiafoe, 7–5, 6–4

Doubles 

  Juan Sebastián Cabal /  Robert Farah def.  Rajeev Ram /  Joe Salisbury, 6–4, 6–2

Singles main-draw entrants

Seeds

 Rankings are as of October 18, 2021

Other entrants
The following players received wildcards into the singles main draw: 
  Andy Murray
  Lorenzo Musetti
  Dennis Novak

The following player received entry using a special exempt:
  Ričardas Berankis

The following players received entry from the qualifying draw: 
  Kevin Anderson 
  Gianluca Mager 
  Alexei Popyrin
  Frances Tiafoe

The following player received entry as a lucky loser:
  Dominik Koepfer

Withdrawals
Before the tournament
  Cristian Garín → replaced by  Dominik Koepfer
  Ugo Humbert → replaced by  Márton Fucsovics

Doubles main-draw entrants

Seeds

 Rankings are as of 18 October 2021

Other entrants
The following pairs received wildcards into the doubles main draw:
  Feliciano López /  Stefanos Tsitsipas
  Oliver Marach /  Philipp Oswald

The following pair received entry from the qualifying draw:
  Alexander Erler /  Lucas Miedler

The following pair received entry as lucky losers:
  Sander Gillé /  Dominik Koepfer

Withdrawals
Before the tournament
  Cristian Garín /  Cameron Norrie → replaced by  Sander Gillé /  Dominik Koepfer
  Kevin Krawietz /  Horia Tecău → replaced by  Lloyd Harris /  Horia Tecău

References

External links
 

Erste Bank Open
Vienna Open
Erste Bank Open
Erste Bank Open